Deuterocohnia brevispicata is a plant species in the genus Deuterocohnia. This species is endemic to Bolivia.

References

brevispicata
Endemic flora of Bolivia